The Little Theatre of Wilkes-Barre is one of the oldest continuously-running community theatres in the United States.

Founded in 1922 as the Drama League, Little Theatre was incorporated as a non-profit under the new name in 1929.  Its first performance was Rudyard Kipling's The Elephant's Child, delivered at what is now Coughlin High School in Wilkes-Barre.

Little Theatre purchased its current location, a former movie theatre, in 1956.  Following renovations, performances at the new location began in 1957.

History
Little Theatre was incorporated as a non-profit, 501(c) 3 Corporation by decree of Judge Valentine on June 17, 1929. Bernard F. Burgunder, Brandon A. Gearhart, Mrs. Fredrick Hillman, Mrs. Simon Long, Todd Rippard, Raijean Breese, Mrs. Franck G. Darte, Annette Evans, Mrs. Hugh Jenkins, Mrs. Ernest G. Smith, Daniel W. Davis and Leonard W. Parkhurst were the members, incorporators, and directors.

Since 1923, Little Theatre has reached over two million people, presenting hundreds of productions.

During the 1920s and 30s, “little theatres” proved to be a testing ground for new plays and talent, as well as a place to develop professionalism, foster self-expression, and have fun!

Little Theatre of Wilkes-Barre is the 3rd continuously running community theatre in the United States, and is still ranked among the 10 best “little theatre” groups in the land and is a charter member of American National Theatre and Academy.

Little Theatre of Wilkes-Barre made its home at the 537 N. Main Street Playhouse in 1957. The building, an old movie theatre, was purchased in 1956 and renovated for theatrical stage use. In 1972, because of renewed federal and state interest in the fine arts, the Pennsylvania Theatre Association approved the building for production, and remarked on the splendid facilities of the stage and equipment.

The theatre's lighting board was a gift from Dorothy Dickson Darte, one of the theatre's founders, and was specially built by Fuchs, an expert and author on stage lighting. Annette Evans provided stage curtains during her lifetime, and the Annette Evans Foundation has provided for Little Theatre, one of her favorite “children”, with grants since her death.

Mission statement
“To provide professional quality, Broadway-style live theatre while ensuring a welcoming environment that enhances the cultural growth of the Greater Wyoming Valley.”

Notes

References
Greater Hazleton Chamber of Commerce
Greater Wilkes-Barre Chamber of Commerce

External links
 Official website

Theatres in Pennsylvania
Theatre companies in Pennsylvania
Buildings and structures in Wilkes-Barre, Pennsylvania
Tourist attractions in Luzerne County, Pennsylvania
1922 establishments in Pennsylvania